Det bästa från Idol is a series of annual releases from the Swedish Idol music competition series.

Albums 
(Names of series winners in bold)

Det bästa från Idol 2004 

 All finalists - "Ain't No Mountain High Enough" by Marvin Gaye & Tammi Terrell
 Lorén Talhaoui - "Vill Ha Dig" by Freestyle
 Daniel Lindström - "If You Don't Know Me By Now" by Harold Melvin & the Blue Notes
 Geraldo Sandell - "I Want You Back" by The Jackson 5
 Nathalie Schmeikal - "Total Eclipse of the Heart" by Bonnie Tyler
 Paul Lötberg - "Hos Dig Är Jag Underbar" by Patrik Isaksson
 Cornelia Dahlgren - "What It Feels Like for a Girl" by Madonna
 Alex Falk - "Celebration" by Kool & the Gang
 Darin Zanyar - "Un-Break My Heart" by Toni Braxton
 Stina Joelsson - "Torn" by Natalie Imbruglia
 Fillip Williams - "Under Ytan" by Uno Svenningsson
 Angel J. Hansson - "Hello" by Lionel Richie
 All finalists - "Larger Than Life" by Backstreet Boys

My Own Idol - Idol 2005 

 Måns Zelmerlöw - "Millennium" by Robbie Williams
 Jonah Hallberg - "Hard To Say I'm Sorry" by Az Yet
 Agnes Carlsson - "My Everything" by Jennifer Brown
 Sebastian Karlsson - "It's Only Rock'n Roll" by The Rolling Stones
 Marième Niang - "As" George Michael & Mary J. Blige
 Ola Svensson - "My All" by Mariah Carey
 Elina Nelson - "Torn" by Natalie Imbruglia
 Cindy Lamréus - "A Moment Like This" by Kelly Clarkson
 Jens Pääjärvi - "Let Me Entertain You" by Robbie Williams
 Maria Albayrak - "Truly Madly Deeply" by Savage Garden
 Sibel Redžep - "Imagine" by John Lennon

Det bästa från Idol 2006 

 Erik Segerstedt - "I Don't Wanna Be" by Gavin Degraw
 Felicia Brandström - "Put Your Records On" by Corinne Bailey Rae
 Markus Fagervall - "She Will Be Loved" by Maroon 5
 Jessica Myrberg - "I Love Rock 'n' Roll" by Joan Jett
 Johan Larsson "Real to Me" by Brian McFadden
 Sara Burnett - "Forever Young" by Alphaville
 Natalie Kadric - "Ain't No Other Man" by Christina Aguilera
 Danny Saucedo - "Öppna din dörr" by Tommy Nilsson
 Linda Seppänen - "Sunday Morning" by No Doubt
 Jonas Snäckmark - "Here Without You" by 3 Doors Down
 Cissi Ramsby - "Not Ready to Make Nice" by Dixie Chicks
 Idol 2006 Allstars - "The Final Countdown" by Europe

Det bästa från Idol 2007 

 Idol 2007 Allstars - "Free Your Mind"
 Christoffer Hiding - "Say It Right"
 Evelina Sewerin - "For Your Eyes Only"
 Daniel Karlsson - "You're the Voice"
 Amanda Jenssen - "Look What They've Done to My Song"
 Mattias Andréasson - "Your Song"
 Anastasia Roobol - "Sleeping Satellite"
 Sam Hagberth - "Tired of Being Sorry"
 Gathania Holmgren - "Walking on Sunshine"
 Marie Picasso - "Flashdance... What a Feeling"
 Andreas Sjöberg - "I Wanna Know What Love Is"
 Patrizia Helander - "Hurt"

Det bästa från Idol 2008 

 Kevin Borg - "Gimme Gimme Gimme"
 Alice Svensson - "These Words"
 Lars Eriksson - "One"
 Anna Bergendahl - "Nothing Compares 2 U"
 Johan Palm - "Beautiful Ones"
 Sepideh Vaziri - "I Will Survive"
 Robin Bengtsson - "Mercy"
 Loulou Lamotte - "Love Me Still"
 Jesper Blomberg - "So Sick"
 Yazmina Simic - "Don't Stop the Music"
 Robin Ericsson - "I Surrender"
 Idol 2008 Allstars - "Thank You For the Music"

Det bästa från Idol 2009 

 Erik Grönwall - "18 and Life"
 Eddie Razaz - "Man In the Mirror"
 Rabih Jaber - "You Are Not Alone"
 Karolina Brånsgård - "This Is a Man's World"
 Tove Östman Styrke - "Hot N Cold"
 Calle Kristiansson - "Walking in Memphis"
 Reza Ningtyas Lindh - "Son of a Preacher Man"
 Camilla Håkansson - "Human Nature"
 Mariette Hansson - "Dear Mister President"
 Erika Selin - "About You Now"
 Nicklas Hocker - "Black Hole Sun"
 Idol Allstars 2009 - "I Wish Everyday Could Be Like Christmas"

Det bästa från Idol 2010 – Audition 

 Linnea Henriksson - "Jumping Jack Flash"
 Jay Smith - "Black Jesus"
 Alice Hagenbrant - "Samson"
 Geir Rönning - "Need You Now"
 Elin Blom - "Nothing Else Matters"
 Linda Varg - "Bubbly"
 Andreas Weise - "Sunny"
 Olle Hedberg - "The Scientist"
 Minnah Karlsson - "Not Ready to Make Nice"
 Sassa Bodensjö - "Weak"
 Daniel Norberg - "Don't Look Back In Anger"

Det bästa från Idol 2010 

 Minnah Karlsson - "Piece of My Heart"
 Olle Hedberg - "No Diggity"
 Geir Rönning - "Ain't No Love in the Heart of the City"
 Linnea Henriksson - "Hope There's Someone"
 Jay Smith - "Heart-Shaped Box"
 Alice Hagenbrant - "Breakaway"
 Andreas Weise - "Ain't No Sunshine"
 Elin Blom - "Hang With Me"
 Daniel Norberg - "High and Dry"
 Sassa Bodensjö - "Dude (Looks Like a Lady)"
 Linda Varg - "Iris"
 Idol Allstars 2010 - "All I Need Is You"

Compilation albums by Swedish artists
Compilation album series
2005 compilation albums
2004 compilation albums
2006 compilation albums
2007 compilation albums
2008 compilation albums
2009 compilation albums
2010 compilation albums